Downham is a small village and former civil parish, now in the parish of South Hanningfield, in Essex, England. The village is in the borough of Chelmsford and in the parliamentary constituency of Rayleigh. In 1931 the parish had a population of 833.

History
There is evidence of Roman remains in the village suggesting it was originally of early Saxon origin, though it is not in the Domesday Book of 1086.
The parish church is dedicated to St Margaret. The oldest section of the church is a 10ft by 11ft square redbrick tower from the late 15th or early 16th century. However, Christians have been recorded as worshipping on the site for over one thousand years. The nave of the church was restored in the nineteenth century, using some material from an earlier 13th-century building, and the interior was refurbished in the 1970s after a fire in March 1977. An ancient Field Maple lies north of the church. The village is home to Downham Hall, which was once the home of the De Beauvoir family, the building which currently stands is smaller than the original 17th-century mansion.

On 1 October 1934 the parish was abolished and merged with South Hanningfield.

Geography
Downham has approximately 200 households. The village is close to Hanningfield Reservoir, with its southwest bank being half a mile north from the village centre.

See also
Ramsden Heath

References

External links
Walking around Downham

Villages in Essex
Former civil parishes in Essex